Maze featuring Frankie Beverly is the debut album by  Bay Area-based R&B group Maze.  Released in 1977 on Capitol Records.

Reception

Signed to a recording contract with Capitol Records  in 1976, Maze would release their debut album, Maze featuring Frankie Beverly in 1977. From that album, Maze would earn a devoted fan base with classic tracks "Happy Feelin's", "While I'm Alone" and "Lady of Magic" ultimately giving them their first gold record.

Track listing
All tracks written by Frankie Beverly.

"Time Is on My Side" – 5:19
"Happy Feelin's" – 7:10
"Color Blind" – 3:22
"Lady of Magic" – 4:45
"While I'm Alone" – 4:35
"You" – 8:24
"Look at California" – 9:27

Personnel
Frankie Beverly - lead vocals, rhythm guitar
Duane Thomas - lead guitar
Robin Duhe - bass guitar
Sam Porter - keyboards
Joe Provost - drums
McKinley "Bug" Williams - percussion, vocals
Ronald "Roame" Lowry - congas, vocals

Charts

Weekly charts

Year-end charts

Singles

References

External links
 Maze Featuring Frankie Beverly -Maze Featuring Frankie Beverly  at Discogs

1977 debut albums
Maze (band) albums
Capitol Records albums